The Next Iron Chef is a limited-run series on the Food Network that aired its fifth season in 2012.  Each season is a stand-alone competition to select a chef to be designated an Iron Chef, who will appear on the Food Network program Iron Chef America.

In Season 1, eight chefs from around the United States battled to be the next Iron Chef. The show debuted Sunday, October 7, 2007, and the hosts were Alton Brown and "The Chairman", Mark Dacascos.  Challenges one through five of the competition were held at the Culinary Institute of America. Challenges six and seven took place in Munich, Germany and Paris, France respectively. The final challenge took place at the Food Network studios in New York City, on the Iron Chef America set. The winner of The Next Iron Chef was Cleveland restaurant chef Michael Symon.

Season 2 premiered on October 4, 2009, and featured ten chefs battling to be the newest Iron Chef.  The show was based in Los Angeles before traveling to Tokyo for two episodes, and again hosted by Alton Brown and "The Chairman" Mark Dacascos.  Following a final battle in Kitchen Stadium, Chicago-born Ecuadorian-American chef Jose Garces, was selected the newest Iron Chef.  Garces debuted as an Iron Chef on January 17, 2010, when he squared off against Seattle chef Rachel Yang.

Food Network began airing commercials for the third season of The Next Iron Chef in July 2010.  It was later announced in an internet press release that Alton Brown and judge Donatella Arpaia would return for season 3. Completing the judges panel are food writer and broadcaster Simon Majumdar and current Iron Chef Michael Symon. Season 3 began airing on October 3, 2010 on Food Network. The winner of season 3 was Marc Forgione. Chef Forgione engaged in his first battle on November 28, 2010. By  November 30, 2010, Next Iron Chef's music composer Craig Marks released the soundtrack "Iron Chef America & The Next Iron Chef", which contains themes from all seasons of both shows.

During Season 4, the eliminated chefs were interviewed during the week following the episode airdate on ABC's The Chew.  The first castoff was interviewed on November 1, 2011.

Season 5 aired from November 4, 2012 to December 23, 2012 and was called The Next Iron Chef: Redemption.

In 2017, the series was revived as Iron Chef Gauntlet.

Judges

Season 1: 2007

Contestants

John Besh (New Orleans, LA); defeated Mario Batali in Battle Andouille in Season 3 of Iron Chef America.
Chris Cosentino (San Francisco, CA); lost to Batali in Battle Garlic, in Season 4.
Jill Davie (Santa Monica, CA) Chef de Cuisine at Josie in Santa Monica, California, and co-host of Fine Living's Shopping with Chefs.
Traci Des Jardins (San Francisco, CA); defeated Batali in Battle Shrimp in Season 2.
Gavin Kaysen (San Diego, CA) Chef de Cuisine at El Bizcocho at the Rancho Bernardo Inn in California.
Morou Ouattara (Washington, D.C.) who lost to Bobby Flay in Battle Peas in Season 3.
Aarón Sanchez (New York, NY) who tied Masaharu Morimoto in Battle Black Bass in Season 2.
Michael Symon (Cleveland, OH) who lost to Masaharu Morimoto in Battle Asparagus in Season 2.

Judges
The contest was judged by food writer Michael Ruhlman, Bon Appétit restaurant editor Andrew Knowlton, and restaurateur Donatella Arpaia.

Contestant progress

 (WIN) The chef won the series
 (WIN) The chef won the challenge.
 (OUT) The chef lost that week's Elimination Challenge and was out of the competition.

Results

Episode 1
Challenge 1: Speed
A speed challenge in which chefs are required to debone a chicken, fillet a salmon, open enough coconuts to produce two cups of coconut milk, shuck six oysters and clams, french a rack of lamb, and slice off a  strip of daikon thin enough to read newsprint through within 15 minutes.
WINNER: Aarón Sanchez
Challenge 2: Artistry
Chefs are challenged to make desserts: one with any available ingredient and the second featuring savory ingredients. Each chef selects one of the following savory ingredients: catfish, tripe, beef shoulder, chorizo, duck confit, bacon, salmon roe, or squid based on the order of their finish in the Speed challenge. The chefs are not allowed to use butter, sugar, or cheese unless they make it themselves.
WINNER: John Besh
ELIMINATED: Traci Des Jardins
First aired: October 7, 2007

Episode 2
Challenge 3: Simplicity
The chefs have 30 minutes to prepare six one-bite (amuse-bouche) dishes that best exemplify their style of cooking. Because of his win in the Artistry challenge in Episode 1, Chef Besh is given the advantage of selecting his ingredients first, and also selecting the order in which the chefs present their dishes.  The chefs serve as judges for each other's dishes.  Chef Sanchez misunderstands the rules and fails to finish plating more than a single serving of his dish, deciding during the judging to give his dish to Chef Besh for tasting.
WINNER: Michael Symon
Challenge 4: Innovation
After a brief introduction to the special ingredients and appliances (and with some tutelage by chef Wylie Dufresne in a special guest appearance), the chefs have 90 minutes to "play" with these items in order to incorporate them into their cooking style.  The chefs then have 90 minutes to prepare a dish using innovative ingredients (e.g., xanthan gum, liquid nitrogen) and innovative appliances (e.g., thermal immersion circulator, Anti-griddle) to prepare a single dish for the judges.  With his win in Challenge 1 of this round, Chef Symon is able to select his ingredients first and had a dedicated set of cooking equipment, while the other contestants have to share a common set.
WINNER: Chris Cosentino
ELIMINATED: Jill Davie
First aired: October 14, 2007

Episode 3
Challenge 5: Resourcefulness (Double Elimination)
The chefs are divided into pairs.  Each chef selects ingredients for his partner and places the ingredients in a sealed cooler. The chefs are taken outdoors, where each chef has 60 minutes to prepare two dishes with the items located in his cooler and the limited ingredients at his individual station.  In addition, the chefs are only able to use a single charcoal grill to cook their dishes.  With his win in the previous challenge, Chris Cosentino is given the privilege of deciding the pairings of contestants.
WINNER: Michael Symon
ELIMINATED: Gavin Kaysen and Morou Ouattara
First aired: October 21, 2007

Episode 4
Challenge 6: Creativity Under Pressure
The remaining four chefs learn that they will be traveling to Germany for this week's challenge. At the Munich airport, the chefs are taken to Lufthansa's catering facilities where their next challenge is to create the ultimate first class meal for passengers, to be finished and presented to the first class cabin of a long-haul jet. They have 90 minutes to prepare a minimum of three dishes.
WINNER: Michael Symon
ELIMINATED: Aarón Sanchez
First aired: October 28, 2007

Episode 5
Challenge 7: Lead and Inspire
The remaining three chefs continue the overseas portion of the competition as they fly to Paris for the next challenge. The chefs must create a meal representing their interpretations of classic American foods, to be served at a dinner hosted by the United States Ambassador to France, with guests including a number of noted French culinary figures.
WINNER: Neither remaining chef was declared the winner.
ELIMINATED: Chris Cosentino
First aired: November 4, 2007

Episode 6
Challenge 8: Attain Greatness
The final competition tales the form of a head-to-head competition in Kitchen Stadium in a traditional Iron Chef America battle. The secret ingredient was swordfish.  Judges Ruhlman, Knowlton and Arpaia are replaced in the on-air tasting portion of the judging by current Iron Chefs Bobby Flay, Cat Cora and Masaharu Morimoto.  The three judges and the three Iron Chefs collaborate to determine the winner.
WINNER: Michael Symon
ELIMINATED: John Besh

First aired: November 11, 2007

Season 2: 2009

Contestants 
 Nate Appleman (Executive Chef and partner, Pulino's Bar and Pizzeria, New York City); lost to Michael Symon in Battle Suckling Pig in Season 7
 Dominique Crenn (Chef de Cuisine, Luce at The Intercontinental Hotel, San Francisco)
 Brad Farmerie (Executive Chef, Double Crown, Madam Geneva, PUBLIC, The Monday Room, New York City); defeated Cat Cora in Battle Maple Syrup in Season 7
 Amanda Freitag (Executive Chef, The Harrison, New York City); lost to Bobby Flay in Battle Alaskan King Crab in Season 7
 Jose Garces (Executive Chef and owner, Amada, Tinto, Distrito, Chifa, Village Whiskey, Garces Trading Company, JG Domestic, Philadelphia; Mercat a la Planxa, Chicago); defeated Bobby Flay in Battle Melon in Season 6
 Eric Greenspan (Executive Chef and owner, The Foundry on Melrose, Los Angeles)
 Jehangir Mehta (Executive Chef and owner, Graffiti, New York City); lost to Masaharu Morimoto in Battle Coconut in Season 7
 Seamus Mullen (Executive Chef and partner, Boqueria Flatiron and Boqueria Soho, New York City)
 Holly Smith (Chef and owner, Cafe Juanita, Poco Carretto Gelato, Kirkland, WA)
 Roberto Treviño (Executive Chef and owner, Budatai, San Juan, Puerto Rico); lost to Mario Batali in Battle Catfish in Season 1

Judges
The judges are restaurateur Donatella Arpaia, food author and long-time Iron Chef America judge Jeffrey Steingarten and sustainable food expert Anya Fernald.

Contestant progress

 (WIN) The chef won the series
 (WIN) The chef won the challenge.
 (OUT) The chef lost that week's Elimination Challenge and was out of the competition.

Results

Episode 1
Challenge 1: Memory
 The Chairman presents each chef with an ingredient associated with their past, and challenges them to make a dish, to be presented family-style, that represents who they are.
WINNER: Jose Garces

Challenge 2: Fearlessness
 The Chairman assigns each chef an exotic ingredient he or she may not have used before.  Exercising his advantage, Chef Garces was allowed to exchange the ingredients of two chefs: Chef Crenn and Chef Mullen.
WINNER: Nate Appleman (Unlaid Eggs)
ELIMINATED: Eric Greenspan (Grasshoppers)
First aired: October 4, 2009

Episode 2
Challenge 3: Simplicity
 In this challenge, the Chairman gives each chef the choice of one traditional cooking vessel from one of a variety of countries; each is designed for a one-pot style of cooking. After 45 minutes of cook time, the contestants must taste and judge their fellow competitors' dishes.
WINNER: Jehangir Mehta

Challenge 4: Interpretation
 In the next challenge, Alton Brown assigns each chef a specific traditional dish from one of three countries; Greece, France and Italy. Each chef is given one hour to create their own interpretation of the dish they were assigned.
WINNER: Seamus Mullen

ELIMINATED: Holly Smith
First aired: October 11, 2009

Episode 3
Challenge 5:  Innovation, Part I
 In this challenge, the chefs are sent in pairs to various restaurants in the Los Angeles area where they must taste the restaurant's signature dish, and then are tasked to duplicate the dish from scratch in 10 minutes. The owners of the restaurant determine which of the two competitors' dishes are closest to the original. The winner is allotted an additional 5 minutes in the next challenge.
 Assignments:
 Vietnamese:  Beef Pho (Chefs Crenn and Garces)
 Korean: Dolsot-bibimbap (Chefs Appleman and Mullen)
 Thai: Green Curry with Fish Balls (Chefs Freitag and Mehta)
 Chinese: Pork and Vegetarian Dumplings (Chefs Treviño and Farmerie)
WINNERS: Chefs Appleman, Crenn, Frietag and Treviño

Challenge 6: Innovation, Part II
 The chefs must use inspiration from their visit to local restaurants to re-interpret a traditional American dish.
WINNER: Seamus Mullen

ELIMINATED: Brad Farmerie
First aired: October 18, 2009

Episode 4
Challenge 7:  Adaptability
 The Chairman presents the chefs with a challenge to test their ability to adapt:  prepare two Mexican-inspired dishes, one sweet and one savory, using a surprise ingredient: tamarind imported from Mexico.  Each chef has 90 minutes total to shop at Los Angeles's Grand Central Market and to cook their dishes.  Late in the cooking period, host Alton Brown added a twist, when he conveyed the Chairman's wish to have a drink featuring tamarind added to the meal.
WINNER: Jehangir Mehta

ELIMINATED: Dominique Crenn
First aired: October 25, 2009

Episode 5
Challenge 8:  Pressure, Part I
 An Indian chef tests how well the remaining contenders perform under pressure. The chefs are to make a one-bite vegetarian representation of the taste of India. As winner of the previous challenge, Chef Mehta has first choice of ingredients.
WINNER: Nate Appleman
Challenge 9:  Pressure, Part II
 The chefs are to make a 5 course Indian dinner. This is a double-elimination challenge. As winner of the previous challenge, Chef Appleman has first choice of the protein ingredients and takes all of the red snapper.
WINNER: Jose Garces
ELIMINATED: Roberto Treviño and Nate Appleman
The remaining 4 chefs receive plane tickets to travel to Tokyo where the next episode takes place.
First aired: November 1, 2009

Episode 6
Challenge 10:  Umami (Deliciousness), Part I: Yakitori
The chefs must create five yakitori, each with umami.
Guest Judge: Iron Chef Masaharu Morimoto
WINNER: Jehangir Mehta

Challenge 11:  Umami (Deliciousness), Part II: Five Flavors of Rice
The chefs must create five dishes featuring five flavors: sweet, sour, salty, bitter and umami.  Each dish must feature rice in some fashion, and be served in a traditional Japanese Bentō box.
Guest Judge: Dr. Yukio Hattori, Director of the Hattori Nutrition College.  Dr. Hattori was a commentator on the original Japanese Iron Chef.
WINNER: Jose Garces
ELIMINATED: Amanda Freitag

First aired: November 8, 2009

Episode 7
Challenge 12:  Integrity
Personal expression through food.
Guest Judges: The Chairman, Dr. Yukio Hattori
FINALISTS: Jose Garces, Jehangir Mehta
ELIMINATED: Seamus Mullen
First aired: November 15, 2009

Episode 8
Challenge 13:  Imagination
The final challenge was a traditional head-to-head Iron Chef battle.  The secret ingredient was racks and ribs, and featured beef, pork and buffalo meat.
Guest Judges: The Chairman, Masaharu Morimoto, Bobby Flay, Michael Symon
WINNER:  Jose Garces
ELIMINATED: Jehangir Mehta
First aired: November 22, 2009

Season 3: 2010

Contestants
 Marco Canora (chef and owner of Hearth, Terroir and Terroir TriBeca in New York City)
 Bryan Caswell (chef and owner of Reef, Stella Sola and Little Bigs in Houston, Texas)
 Maneet Chauhan (chef at Vermillion in Chicago, Illinois and New York), lost to Masaharu Morimoto in Battle Leeks in Season 8
 Mary Dumont (Executive Chef at Harvest in Cambridge, Massachusetts), lost to Cat Cora in Battle Milk and Cream in Season 5
 Duskie Estes (chef and owner of Zazu Restaurant and Farm, Bovolo and Black Pig Meat Company in Sonoma County, California)
 Marc Forgione (chef and owner of Marc Forgione in New York), sous chef for Laurent Tourondel, winner of Battle Goat Cheese in Season 3
 Andrew Kirschner (Executive chef at Wilshire in Santa Monica, California)
 Mario Pagán (chef and owner of Chayote and Lemongrass in Puerto Rico)
 Celina Tio (chef and owner of Julian in Kansas City, Missouri)
 Ming Tsai (chef and owner of Blue Ginger in Wellesley, Massachusetts), defeated Bobby Flay in Battle Duck in Season 1

Judges
The judges are restaurateur Donatella Arpaia, food writer and broadcaster Simon Majumdar and current Iron Chef Michael Symon, winner of the Season 1 competition.

Contestant progress

 (WIN) The chef won the series.
 (WIN) The chef won the challenge.
 (OUT) The chef lost that week's Elimination Challenge and was out of the competition.

Results

Episode 1: Ingenuity
Secret Ingredient Challenge (Secret Ingredient: Bread):  Each chef must make a sandwich expressing his or her culinary style
WINNER: Duskie Estes

Chairman's Challenge: Cook a dish on the beach, using tropical ingredients.  Their dish must feature the one food they would want to have on a deserted island.
As the winner of the Secret Ingredient Challenge, Chef Estes was able to have a five-minute advantage to grab ingredients from the "pantry" and start cooking.
WINNER: Ming Tsai
ELIMINATED:  Andrew Kirschner
First aired: October 3, 2010

Episode 2: Innovation
Secret Ingredient Challenge (Secret Ingredients: Coffee and Donuts): Create a breakfast transforming these two ingredients.
WINNER: Maneet Chauhan
DISADVANTAGE: Mary Dumont
Chairman's Challenge: Roadside diner classics
As the winner of the previous challenge, Maneet Chauhan was able to assign the dishes to prepare to each chef. Mary Dumont, having come in last, received a one-minute penalty assessed at the beginning.
WINNER: Marc Forgione
ELIMINATED: Mario Pagán
First aired: October 10, 2010

Episode 3: Resourcefulness
Secret Ingredient Challenge (Secret Ingredients: Pickles): Create a "portable snack" expressing the ingredient's versatility.
WINNER: Marc Forgione
DISADVANTAGE: Duskie Estes
Chairman's Challenge: Create two dishes that revolve around the fishes the chefs caught. Chefs who were short on fish were also allowed to use sardines as a focus ingredient too.
As the winner of the previous challenge, Marc Forgione was able to replace one of his caught fishes with someone else. He replaced one of his scorpion fishes with Celina Tio's caught snapper as a result. Duskie Estes, having come in last, received a one-minute penalty assessed at the beginning.
WINNER: Marco Canora
ELIMINATED: Mary Dumont
First aired: October 17, 2010

Episode 4: Transformation
Secret Ingredient Challenge (Secret Ingredients: Condiments): Each chef is assigned to transform a selected condiment, such as mayonnaise, ketchup, or ranch dressing, into a dish featuring the condiment.
WINNER: Celina Tio
DISADVANTAGE: Maneet Chauhan
Chairman's Challenge: At the San Diego County Fair, each chef must transform ingredients found at the fair's concession stands into three dishes: one fried, one on a stick, and one grilled. All dishes must be prepared on a large outdoor grill.
As the winner of the previous challenge, Celina Tio had a five-minute head start in the 30-minute hunt for ingredients on the fair grounds. Maneet Chauhan, having come in last, received a one-minute penalty assessed at the beginning of cooking.
WINNER: Celina Tio
ELIMINATED: Duskie Estes
First aired: October 24, 2010

Episode 5: Respect
Secret Ingredient Challenge (Secret Ingredient: Potatoes)
WINNER: Marco Canora
DISADVANTAGE: Marc Forgione
Chairman's Challenge: Each chef was challenged to cook four dishes; one each representing the northern, southern, eastern and western regions of the United States.
WINNER: Ming Tsai
ELIMINATED: Maneet Chauhan
First aired: October 31, 2010

Note: In this episode,  Iron Chef Jose Garces served as a guest judge, substituting for fellow Iron Chef Michael Symon.

Episode 6: Inspiration
Secret Ingredient Challenge (Secret Ingredient: Chocolate): The chefs were given two hours to create a dessert display.
WINNER: Ming Tsai
Chairman's Challenge: Each chef was tasked with creating his or her own buffet display and was given 3 hours to create three hot and two cold entrees. As winner of the previous challenge, Ming Tsai was given a one-minute head start on selecting his ingredients.
WINNER: Marco Canora
ELIMINATED: Bryan Caswell
(This episode was originally intended to be a double elimination.  However, because there was a three-way tie for the second chef to be eliminated, the remaining four chefs were allowed to continue to the next round.)
First aired: November 7, 2010

Episode 7: Seduction
Secret Ingredient Challenge (Secret Ingredient: Liquor): Create a cocktail along with a suitable bar food snack to associate with the drink.
WINNER: Marco Canora
Chairman's Challenge: Seduce the judges by creating three luxurious dishes featuring one luxury protein. Each chef selected a safe containing an unknown quality ingredient in turn, before collecting additional ingredients from four fine dining restaurants in 30 minutes. Marco Canora had the advantage to trade his unopened safe for another chef's ingredient, along with selecting at which restaurant each chef will begin gathering ingredients. Canora traded his unopened safe for Tsai's ingredient: Wagyū beef.
WINNER: Marco Canora
ELIMINATED: Celina Tio, Ming Tsai
First aired: November 14, 2010

Episode 8: Honor 
Secret Ingredient: Thanksgiving Feast (heritage turkey, white pekin duck, venison, lobster)
WINNER: Marc Forgione
ELIMINATED: Marco Canora
First aired: November 21, 2010

Season 4: 2011: Super Chefs

Contestants
 Anne Burrell (Host of Secrets of a Restaurant Chef and Worst Cooks in America, also sous-chef for Mario Batali on Iron Chef America); while being partnered with Michael Symon both defeated Cat Cora and Robert Irvine in Battle Deep Freeze in Season 9
 Michael Chiarello (Owner of Bottega Restaurant, Napa Valley; host of Easy Entertaining with Michael Chiarello)
 Elizabeth Falkner (Owner of Citizen Cake and Orson, San Francisco); lost to Cat Cora in Battle Honey in Season 3. Also has appeared on Food Network Challenge
 Alex Guarnaschelli (Chef and Owner, Butter and The Darby, New York; Host, Alex’s Day Off, Judge, Chopped); lost to Cat Cora in Battle Farmers' Market in Season 5
 Chuck Hughes (Chef and Owner, Garde Manger, Montreal; Host, Chuck’s Day Off Cooking Channel); defeated Bobby Flay in Battle Canadian Lobster in Season 9
 Robert Irvine (Chef and Owner, Robert Irvine's eat!, Hilton Head Island; Host, Dinner: Impossible, Restaurant: Impossible, Worst Cooks in America); has lost twice while being partnered on special holiday episodes of Iron Chef America
 Beau MacMillan (Executive Chef, Sanctuary on Camelback Mountain, Phoenix; Host, Worst Cooks in America); defeated Bobby Flay in Battle American Kobe Beef in Season 3
 Spike Mendelsohn (Chef and Owner, Good Stuff Eatery, Washington D.C.; Host, Kelsey & Spike Cook [Food2.com]; contestant on Top Chef (season 4)); lost to Michael Symon in Battle Prosciutto in Season 8
 Marcus Samuelsson (Chef and Owner, Red Rooster Harlem, New York; Judge,  24 Hour Restaurant Battle, Chopped, Next Food Network Star); lost to Bobby Flay in Battle Corn in Season 6
 Geoffrey Zakarian (Chef and Owner, The National and The Lambs Club, New York; Judge, 24 Hour Restaurant Battle, Chopped); lost to Masaharu Morimoto in Battle Sardines in Season 8

Judges
The judges for season four were current Iron Chef Michael Symon, food writer and broadcaster Simon Majumdar, and Iron Chef Judy Joo from Iron Chef UK.

Contestant progress

 (WIN) The chef won the series.
 (WIN) The chef won the chairman's challenge.
 (CO) The chef competed in and won the cook-off.
 (OUT) The chef lost that week's elimination challenge and cook-off and was eliminated from the competition.

Results

Episode 1: Resourcefulness

 Chairman's Challenge: "Primal: Heat and Meat"
 Chefs are paired in teams of two, with Chef Spike choosing the teams. The teams are taken to a remote wilderness location, where they must butcher a half-hog, build a fire, and make two collaborative dishes that demonstrate resourcefulness. The least successful team is sent to the Secret Ingredient Showdown.

Teams
 Spike Mendelsohn and Marcus Samuelsson
 Anne Burrell and Robert Irvine
 Alex Guarnaschelli and Elizabeth Falkner
 Geoffrey Zakarian and Beau MacMillan
 Michael Chiarello and Chuck Hughes

 WINNERS: Geoffrey Zakarian and  Beau MacMillan

 BOTTOM TWO: Spike Mendelsohn and Marcus Samuelsson

 Secret Ingredient Showdown: Scallops

 With the choice of two ingredients under red and black covers, the chefs agree upon a selection.  Chefs Spike and Marcus chose the ingredient under the red cover, which was large sea scallops, while the other ingredient, hidden under the black cover, was canned tuna. They are given 30 minutes to produce one dish of Iron Chef quality using the selected ingredient.

 CONTINUING IN THE COMPETITION: Marcus Samuelsson

 ELIMINATED: Spike Mendelsohn

 First aired: October 30, 2011

Episode 2: Transformation

 Chairman's Challenge: "Take Me Out to the Ballgame"
 The chefs are given 15 minutes to gather necessary ingredients from ballpark vendors and 60 minutes to transform two stadium classics at Petco Park. Because they won the first Chairman's Challenge, Chefs Zakarian and MacMillan are given an additional five minutes for gathering ingredients. The two least successful chefs are sent to the Secret Ingredient Showdown.

 WINNER: Alex Guarnaschelli

 BOTTOM TWO: Robert Irvine and Michael Chiarello

 Secret Ingredient Showdown: Peanuts

 CONTINUING IN THE COMPETITION: Michael Chiarello

 ELIMINATED: Robert Irvine

 First Aired: November 6, 2011

Episode 3: Ingenuity

 Chairman's Challenge: "Let's All Go to the Lobby"
 The chefs are asked to create two dishes (one sweet and one savory) demonstrating ingenuity using movie theater candy in 60 minutes. Because she won the second Chairman's Challenge, Chef Guarnaschelli is allowed to select her candy and chose the other chefs' candy. The two least successful chefs are sent to the Secret Ingredient Showdown.

Ingredient Order:

 Chocolate Covered Raisins: Chef Guarnaschelli
 Malt Balls: Chef Falkner
 Popcorn: Chef Hughes
 Gummy Candy: Chef Chiarello
 Cinnamon Candy: Chef Zakarian
 Root Beer: Chef Burrell
 Chocolate Covered Caramels: Chef Samuelsson
 Sweet and Sour Candy: Chef MacMillan

 WINNER: Elizabeth Falkner

 BOTTOM TWO: Chuck Hughes and Beau MacMillan

 Secret Ingredient Showdown: Tofu

 CONTINUING IN THE COMPETITION: Beau MacMillan

 ELIMINATED: Chuck Hughes

 First Aired: November 13, 2011

Episode 4: Improvisation 

 Chairman's Challenge: "Food is Funny"
 Comedian Kevin Nealon meets the chefs at the Improv Comedy Club and selects four mandatory ingredients the chefs must use: Octopus, Kumquats, Tortillas, and Marshmallows. The chefs must cook a dish using all four ingredients in 45 minutes. Because she won the third Chairman's Challenge, Chef Falkner is given five extra minutes to start the preparation of her dish. The two least successful chefs are sent to the Secret Ingredient Showdown.

 WINNER: Michael Chiarello

 BOTTOM TWO: Geoffrey Zakarian and Beau MacMillan

 Secret Ingredient Showdown: Coconuts

 CONTINUING IN THE COMPETITION: Geoffrey Zakarian

 ELIMINATED: Beau MacMillan

 First Aired: November 20, 2011

Episode 5: Storytelling

 Chairman's Challenge: "New York on a Plate"
 The chefs create a culinary story based on a postcard drawing of New York City landmarks. Because he won the previous Chairman's Challenge, Chef Chiarello is given the choice of landmarks. The chefs have 20 minutes to shop at the Grand Central Market and 45 minutes to cook for six people (the original four judges, along with Iron Chef Marc Forgione and Chef Charlie Palmer) at the Grand Central Terminal. The two least successful chefs are sent to the Secret Ingredient Showdown.

Landmark Order:

 Statue of Liberty : Chef Chiarello
 Times Square: Chef Zakarian
 Broadway: Chef Samuelsson
 Empire State Building: Chef Guarnaschelli
 Central Park : Chef Burrell
 Brooklyn Bridge : Chef Falkner

 WINNER: Anne Burrell

 BOTTOM TWO: Marcus Samuelsson and Elizabeth Falkner

 Secret Ingredient Showdown: Bagels 

 CONTINUING IN THE COMPETITION: Elizabeth Falkner

 ELIMINATED: Marcus Samuelsson

 First Aired: November 27, 2011

Episode 6: Risk

 Chairman's Challenge: "Food Auction"
 The Chairman takes the chefs to an auction house in Chelsea, where they each place bids on the shortest amount of time in which they think they can create a dish with each ingredient presented. The fifth ingredient is given to the last remaining chef after all the other ingredients have been won. The chef with the last ingredient gets five minutes less than the lowest bid on any other ingredient. The lowest bid is 25 minutes by Chefs Chiarello and Falkner, therefore giving Chef Guarnaschelli 20 minutes to cook a leg of lamb. By winning the last Chairman's Challenge, Chef Burrell is allowed to be the fourth taster and the least successful chef selected by Chef Burrell (Chef Zakarian) is sent to the Secret Ingredient Showdown along with the other least successful chef chosen by the three regular judges.

Ingredient Order:

 Canned Sardines: Chef Burrell (50 minutes)
 Wagyu Beef: Chef Zakarian (30 minutes)
 Maine Lobster: Chef Chiarello (25 minutes)
 Tuna Jerky: Chef Falkner (25 minutes)
 Leg of Lamb: Chef Guarnaschelli (20 minutes)

 WINNER: Elizabeth Falkner

 BOTTOM TWO: Anne Burrell and Geoffrey Zakarian

 Secret Ingredient Showdown: Ponzu and Panko Bread Crumb Dessert

 CONTINUING IN THE COMPETITION: Geoffrey Zakarian

 ELIMINATED: Anne Burrell

 First Aired: December 4, 2011

Episode 7: Passion 

 Chairman's Challenge: "Hamptons Beach Cookout"
 The competitors cater a beach cookout for 20 guests, plus the judges, at the Montauk Yacht Club. The chefs are given $500 and two hours to source their own ingredients. Once completed, each chef is given two hours to prepare a three course seafood tasting menu that demonstrates their passion for food. Because she won the previous Chairman's Challenge, Chef Falkner is given a 15 minute head start and a ride in a speedboat to her first location to gather ingredients. A winner is declared for this challenge, the least successful chef is eliminated, and the two remaining chefs go to the Secret Ingredient Showdown in Kitchen Stadium.

 WINNER (advances to the Finale): Geoffrey Zakarian

 ELIMINATED: Alex Guarnaschelli

 Secret Ingredient Showdown: Three-Bite Crackers and Wine Appetizer Course

 CONTINUING IN THE COMPETITION: Elizabeth Falkner

 ELIMINATED: Michael Chiarello
 
 First Aired: December 11, 2011

Episode 8: Pressure

 Chairman's Challenge: "Holiday Meal"

 Chefs Falkner and Zakarian face a pressure-filled finale in Kitchen Stadium, where the secret ingredients are: Beef Crown Roast, Candy Canes, Clementines, Acorn & Butternut Squash, Salt Cod, Brussels Sprouts, Unfiltered Apple Cider and Parsnips. They must create three Christmas theme dishes with those ingredients for guest judges Bobby Flay and Masaharu Morimoto along with the regular three judges and the Chairman. During the course of the battle, the Chairman's first surprise forces the chefs to use cranberries as another theme ingredient they must create a dish with. Also, he gives them the choice of one former competitor to cook with for 15 minutes on each side of the kitchen, and they both choose Chef Guarnaschelli. The Chairman's second surprise given to the chefs is to create a frozen dessert using the ice cream machine. The Chairman's final surprise is for each chef to make a "holiday-themed" cocktail served in a martini glass.

 WINNER: Geoffrey Zakarian

 ELIMINATED: Elizabeth Falkner

 First Aired: December 18, 2011

Season 5: 2012: Redemption

Contestants 

 Duskie Estes (chef and owner of Zazu Restaurant and Farm, Bovolo and Black Pig Meat Company in Sonoma County, California); Redemption from Season 3
 Elizabeth Falkner (Owner of Citizen Cake and Orson, San Francisco); lost to Cat Cora in Battle Honey in Season 3. Also has appeared on Food Network Challenge; Redemption from Season 4
 Alex Guarnaschelli (Chef and Owner, Butter and The Darby, New York; Host, Alex's Day Off, Judge, Chopped); lost to Cat Cora in Battle Farmers' Market in Season 5; Redemption from Season 4
 Spike Mendelsohn (Chef and Owner, Good Stuff Eatery, Washington D.C.; Host, Kelsey & Spike Cook [Food2.com]; lost to Michael Symon in Battle Prosciutto in Season 8; Redemption from Season 4
 Nate Appleman (Executive Chef and partner, Pulino's Bar and Pizzeria, New York City); lost to Michael Symon in Battle Suckling Pig in Season 7; Redemption from Season 2
 Amanda Freitag (Executive Chef, The Harrison, New York City); lost to Bobby Flay in Battle Alaskan King Crab in Season 7; Judge, Chopped; Redemption from Season 2
 Eric Greenspan (Executive Chef and owner, The Foundry on Melrose, Los Angeles); beat Bobby Flay in Battle Goose in Season 8; Redemption from Season 2
 Jehangir Mehta (Executive Chef and owner, Graffiti, New York City); lost to Masaharu Morimoto in Battle Coconut in Season 7; Redemption from Season 2
 Marcel Vigneron (Owner of the catering company Modern Global Tasting, Los Angeles, California) 
 Tim Love (Executive Chef and owner, The Lonesome Dove Western Bistro, Fort Worth, Texas); beat Masaharu Morimoto in Battle Chile in Season 4

Judges
The judges for this season are: Iron Chef Geoffrey Zakarian, restaurateur Donatella Arpaia, and food writer Simon Majumdar.

Contestant progress

 (WIN) The chef won the series.
 (WIN) The chef won the chairman's challenge.
 (CO) The chef competed in and won the cook-off.
 (OUT) The chef lost that week's elimination challenge and cook-off and was eliminated from the competition.

Results

Episode 1: Resourcefulness

 Chairman's Challenge: "Resourcefulness"
 Chefs are brought to a beach and given an ingredient that they struggled with in a previous competition.

Ingredients
 Alex Guarnaschelli: Lobster
 Amanda Freitag: Shiitake Mushrooms
 Duskie Estes: Calamari
 Elizabeth Falkner: Black Garlic
 Eric Greenspan: Grasshoppers
 Jehangir Mehta: Buffalo
 Marcel Vigneron: Avocado
 Nate Appleman: Banana
 Spike Mendelsohn: Scallops
 Tim Love: Kale

 WINNER: Alex Guarnaschelli

 BOTTOM TWO: Spike Mendelsohn and Tim Love

 Secret Ingredient Showdown: Pineapple

 The chefs have 30 minutes to create a dish featuring pineapple.  Chef Love creates a dish of grilled quail, fried kale, and pickled pineapple.  Chef Mendelsohn creates a Vietnamese-inspired sweet and sour branzino.

 CONTINUING IN THE COMPETITION: Spike Mendelsohn

 ELIMINATED: Tim Love

 First aired: November 4, 2012

Episode 2: Innovation

 Chairman's Challenge: "Innovation"
 Chefs are divided into three groups of three, each of which has to develop an innovative version of a global dish - falafel, tacos, or banh mi.  As the winning chef of the previous chairman's challenge, Chef Guarnaschelli was allowed to assign each chef to a group.

Groups
 Tacos: Alex Guarnaschelli, Spike Mendelsohn, Duskie Estes
 Banh Mi: Eric Greenspan, Nate Appleman, Elizabeth Falkner
 Falafel: Jehangir Mehta, Marcel Vigneron, Amanda Freitag

 WINNER: Jehangir Mehta (Eric Greenspan and Alex Guarnaschelli were top in their respective groups)

 BOTTOM THREE: Elizabeth Falkner, Amanda Freitag, and Duskie Estes

 Secret Ingredient Showdown: White bread

 The chefs have thirty minutes to make a dish highlighting plain white bread.  Chef Freitag makes pork meatballs with parmesan breadcrumbs, Chef Estes makes egg yolk ravioli with bacon brown butter croutons and Chef Falkner makes a Monte Cristo sandwich with french toast ice cream.

 CONTINUING IN THE COMPETITION: Elizabeth Falkner and Amanda Freitag

 ELIMINATED: Duskie Estes

 First aired: November 11, 2012

Episode 3: Simplicity

 Chairman's Challenge: "Simplicity"
 Each chef is photographed by food/chef photographer Todd Selby.  The chefs are then split up into four groups of two, with each chef making an amuse bouche that reflects the personality of their opponent.  The losing chef in each pairing must cook for their life.  As the winner of the previous challenge, Chef Mehta splits up the chefs.

Groups
 Alex Guarnaschelli and Marcel Vigneron
 Elizabeth Falkner and Amanda Freitag
 Nate Appleman and Eric Greenspan
 Jehangir Mehta and Spike Mendelsohn

 WINNER: Amanda Freitag (Spike Mendelsohn, Alex Guarnaschelli and Nate Appleman won their respective matchups)

 BOTTOM FOUR: Elizabeth Falkner, Jehangir Mehta, Marcel Vigneron and Eric Greenspan

 Secret Ingredient Showdown: Cereal

 The chefs must create a dish containing Kellogg's Raisin Bran and Rice Krispies.  Chef Vigneron makes a Rice Krispies and Raisin Bran treat with coconut ice cream, Chef Falkner makes a Rice Krispies and Raisin Bran tartufo bianco, Chef Greenspan makes a Rice Krispies crusted tuna over a Raisin Bran purée, and Chef Mehta makes a Rice Krispies crab cake and Raisin Bran chevda.

 CONTINUING IN THE COMPETITION: Elizabeth Falkner, Marcel Vigneron and Jehangir Mehta

 ELIMINATED: Eric Greenspan

 First aired: November 18, 2012

Episode 4: Transformation

 Chairman's Challenge: "Transformation"
 Each chef is asked to transform  a canned meat into a high-class dish. The chefs were told to choose from an assortment of cans on the table. Three of the cans only had a question mark on their labels. As the winner of the previous challenge, Chef Freitag chose last and was given the option to steal one of her opponent's cans, forcing them to choose from whatever was left on the table, but she declined.

Ingredients

 Vigneron: Canned Clams
 Mehta: Mystery Can (Chicken)
 Mendelsohn: Canned Vienna Sausage
 Guarnaschelli: Canned Spiced Ham
 Falkner: Mystery Can (Roast Beef)
 Appleman: Mystery Can (Tuna)
 Freitag: Canned Corned Beef

 WINNER: Elizabeth Falkner

 BOTTOM TWO: Marcel Vigneron and Spike Mendelsohn

 Secret Ingredient Showdown: Lobster

 The chefs have thirty minutes to make a dish highlighting lobster as the main ingredient.  Chef Mendelsohn makes lobster laksa while Chef Vigneron makes lobster and mango salad.  The chefs made the decision to plate their dishes on the same plate. This decision displeased the judges, to the point where they considered eliminating both chefs.

 CONTINUING IN THE COMPETITION: Marcel Vigneron

 ELIMINATED: Spike Mendelsohn

 First aired: November 25, 2012

Episode 5: Risk

 Chairman's Challenge: "Risk"
The chefs walk into an airplane hangar, where they each place bids on the shortest amount of time in which they think they can create a dish with each ingredient presented. The sixth ingredient is given to the last remaining chef after all the other ingredients have been won. The chef with the last ingredient gets five minutes less than the lowest bid on any other ingredient. The lowest bid is 25 minutes by Chef Mehta, therefore giving Chef Appleman 20 minutes to create a dish out of mortadella. By winning the last Chairman's Challenge, Chef Falkner is allowed to be the fourth taster and the least successful chef selected by Chef Falkner (Chef Appleman) is sent to the Secret Ingredient Showdown along with the other least successful chef chosen by the three regular judges. It is also noted here that the remaining five contestants next week will be going to Vegas. 

Ingredients

 Cow Heads: Marcel Vigneron (50 minutes)
 Paiche: Elizabeth Falkner (50 minutes)
 Bison Ribs: Alex Guarnaschelli (45 minutes)
 Wheel of Parmesan: Amanda Freitag (40 minutes)
 Ostrich Eggs: Jehangir Mehta (25 minutes)
 Mortadella: Nate Appleman (20 minutes)

 WINNER: Marcel Vigneron

 BOTTOM TWO: Nate Appleman and Elizabeth Falkner

 Secret Ingredient Showdown: Anchovies

 The chefs have thirty minutes to make a dish highlighting anchovies as the main ingredient. 
 CONTINUING IN THE COMPETITION: Nate Appleman

 ELIMINATED: Elizabeth Falkner

 First aired: December 2, 2012

Episode 6: Fusion

Chairman's Challenge: "Fusion"
The chefs arrive in Las Vegas at the MGM Grand and find out they will be attending a wedding. It is a wedding between two unlikely ingredients.  As the winner of the previous challenge, Chef Vigneron gets to choose who gets what pairing he will use and decide the pairings to be used by the remaining chefs. They have 45 minutes to make a dish with the following pairings.

 Blue Cheese and Peanut Butter:  Marcel Vigneron
 Bone Marrow and Rainbow Candies: Jehangir Mehta
 Clams and Strawberries: Nate Appleman 
 Chicken Liver and Peppermint Candies:  Alex Guarnaschelli
 Calamari and Miniature Marshmallows: Amanda Freitag

WINNER: Amanda Freitag

BOTTOM TWO: Nate Appleman and Jehangir Mehta

 Secret Ingredient Showdown: Shrimp

 The chefs have thirty minutes to make a dish highlighting shrimp as the main ingredient, while using a traditional Japanese teppanyaki grill.
 
 CONTINUING IN THE COMPETITION: Nate Appleman

 ELIMINATED: Jehangir Mehta

 First aired: December 9, 2012

Episode 7: Transcendence

Chairman's Challenge: "Transcendence"
The chefs are tasked to prepare a buffet featuring a mystery ingredient chosen by magician David Copperfield: bacon.  Chef Freitag, as the winner of the previous challenge, splits the chefs into pairs.

 Amanda Freitag and Nate Appleman
 Alex Guarnaschelli and Marcel Vigneron

WINNERS: Amanda Freitag and Nate Appleman

BOTTOM TWO: Alex Guarnaschelli and Marcel Vigneron

 Secret Ingredient Showdown: Chocolate

 The chefs are asked to choose two types of Hershey's candy and make a savory dish with a holiday theme.  Chef Vigneron makes roasted lamb with eggplant camponata and white chocolate curry risotto.  Chef Guarnaschelli makes duck breast and white chocolate, fennel and cherry salad with a fried duck heart and dark chocolate.
 
 CONTINUING IN THE COMPETITION: Alex Guarnaschelli

 ELIMINATED: Marcel Vigneron

 First aired: December 16, 2012

Episode 8: Passion and Respect

Chairman's Challenges: "Passion" and "Respect"
The season finale consists of two challenges of Passion and Respect. First in the Passion challenge, the remaining chefs are tasked to create in 45 minutes a dish using an ingredient one of the judges is passionate about. The two most successful chefs proceed to the finale in Kitchen Stadium, while the least successful chef is eliminated.

Ingredients

 Farm-raised Chicken (Geoffrey Zakarian): Amanda Freitag
 Haddock (Simon Majumdar): Nate Appleman
 Sea Urchin (Donatella Arpaia): Alex Guarnaschelli

CONTINUING IN THE COMPETITION: Amanda Freitag and Alex Guarnaschelli

ELIMINATED: Nate Appleman

In Kitchen Stadium, the final Respect challenge requires Chef Guarnaschelli and Chef Freitag to create three dishes in one hour, assisted by two sous chefs each. Each of their offerings must include two ingredients per dish that are staples in the dishes of three senior Iron Chefs:  Iron Chef Bobby Flay, Iron Chef Masaharu Morimoto, and Iron Chef Michael Symon. The Chefs are told to pay respect to the Iron Chefs' signature flavors, while still cooking in their own style and showcasing their own abilities. Iron Chefs Flay, Morimoto, and Symon also appear as guest judges along with the three regular judges.
 
Ingredients

 Bobby Flay: Corn, Avocado, Limes, Chili Peppers
 Masaharu Morimoto: Panko, Ponzu, Soy Sauce, Miso, Daikon Radish, Wasabi
 Michael Symon: Eggplant, Feta Cheese, Olives, Phyllo Dough

 WINNER: Alex Guarnaschelli

 ELIMINATED: Amanda Freitag

 First aired: December 23, 2012

Vietnamese version
A Vietnamese version of The Next Iron Chef premiered on November 18, 2012 on VTV3 which also broadcasts Iron Chef Vietnam. It premiered a week after Iron Chef Vietnam ended the first series.

Thai version
A Thai version of The Next Iron Chef premiered on June 23, 2019 on Channel 7 (Thailand) During The Iron Chef Season 8

References

Food Network original programming
2007 American television series debuts
2000s American cooking television series
2010s American cooking television series
The Next
2012 American television series endings
Cooking competitions in the United States